The 2011 FIBA Stanković Continental Champions' Cup, or 2011 FIBA Mini World Cup, officially called Dongfeng Yueda KIA FIBA Stanković Continental Champions' Cup 2011 editions (I) and (II), were the 7th and 8th annual FIBA Stanković Continental Champions' Cup tournaments. They were held as two separate round-robin tournaments, in Haining and Guangzhou, from August 1 to 9.

Haining Tournament

Participating teams

Matches - Group stage 
- 1 AUG -  -  67:64

- 1 AUG -  -  99:97

- 2 AUG -  -  76:68

- 2 AUG -  -  67:52

- 3 AUG -  -  60:53

- 3 AUG -  -  69:62

Standings

Matches - Final stage 
- 4 AUG (Third-place Playoff) -  -  50:49

- 4 AUG (Final) -  -  85:66

Final standings

Guangzhou Tournament

Participating teams

Matches - Group stage 
- 6 AUG -  -  55:52

- 6 AUG -  -  74:71

- 7 AUG -  -   86:58

- 7 AUG -  -  89:69

- 8 AUG -  -  73:70

- 8 AUG -  -  70:45

Standings

Matches - Final stage 
- 9 AUG (Third-place Playoff) -  -  64:54

- 9 AUG (Final) -  -  80:77

Final standings

External links 
  

2010
2011–12 in Chinese basketball
2011–12 in Australian basketball
2011–12 in Angolan basketball
2011–12 in Russian basketball
2011 in New Zealand basketball